Madinabonu Mannopova (born 13 April 2001) is an Uzbekistani taekwondo athlete. She won a silver medal at the 2018 Asian Games and a bronze at the 2018 Asian Championships.

References

2001 births
Living people
Uzbekistani female taekwondo practitioners
Asian Games medalists in taekwondo
Medalists at the 2018 Asian Games
Asian Games silver medalists for Uzbekistan
Taekwondo practitioners at the 2018 Asian Games
Asian Taekwondo Championships medalists
21st-century Uzbekistani women